Peter Roes (born 4 May 1964) is a Belgian former racing cyclist. He rode in three editions of the Tour de France. He also competed in the team pursuit event at the 1984 Summer Olympics.

References

External links
 

1964 births
Living people
Belgian male cyclists
People from Herentals
Cyclists at the 1984 Summer Olympics
Olympic cyclists of Belgium
Cyclists from Antwerp Province